The Lupong Tagapagpaganap ng Pook (LTP) was the executive body for the two former autonomous regions of Western Mindanao and Central Mindanao in the Philippines.

Chairman

Each of the LTP was headed by the Lupon Chairman which directly reported to the President of the Philippines. Holders of the position were also the chairman of their respective region's Regional Development Councils. The chairman was responsible for the implementation or supervision of the implementation of policies, programs and legislations enacted by the Sangguniang Pampook (Regional Legislative Assembly). The Chairman could approve or veto any legislation proposed by the Sangguniang Pampook. In the case of the latter, the legislature could override a veto by a two-thirds majority vote.

List of chairmen

Western Mindanao (Region IX)
Ulbert Ulama Tugung (December 9, 1979–1984; July 16, 1986 – November 22, 1986)
Sali Wali
Noring Tugung
Elnorita Tugung (November 27, 1986–?)

Central Mindanao (Region XII)
Simeon Datumanong (December 9, 1979–1984)
Amelil Malaguio (1984–1986)
Zacaria Candao
Abdulrahman Alam
Ali Bashir Lucman

References

Autonomous Region in Muslim Mindanao